Concetto Marchesi (1 February 1878 – 12 February 1957) was an Italian politician. He represented the Italian Communist Party in the Constituent Assembly of Italy from 1946 to 1948 and in the Chamber of Deputies from 1948 to 1957.

He was also an academic and Latinist.

References
La Camera dei Deputati - Legislature precedenti

1878 births
1957 deaths
Politicians from Catania
Italian Communist Party politicians
Members of the Constituent Assembly of Italy
Deputies of Legislature I of Italy
Deputies of Legislature II of Italy
Italian Latinists